Journey to the Ants: a Story of Scientific Exploration is a 1994 book by the evolutionary biologist Bert Hölldobler and the biologist Edward O. Wilson. The book was written as a popularized account for the layman of the science earlier presented in their winner of the Pulitzer Prize for General Non-Fiction in 1991, The Ants (1990).

Editions
 Paperback, on The Belknap Press of Harvard University Press: 

1994 non-fiction books
American non-fiction books
English-language books
Entomology books
Works by Bert Hölldobler
Works by E. O. Wilson
Zoology books
Belknap Press books
Myrmecology